Department Store is a 1935 British crime film directed by Leslie S. Hiscott and starring Geraldine Fitzgerald, Eve Gray, Garry Marsh and Sebastian Shaw. It is also known by the alternative title Bargain Basement.

Production
The film was a quota quickie produced at Twickenham Studios by Julius Hagen for distribution by RKO.

Plot 
The heir to a London department store must learn the business, but he must start off by working his way through the various menial jobs incognito first. However, a crooked manager has arranged, for a cracksman, just out of gaol, to join the staff. The two young men from different walks of life, get mistaken for the other. Both succeed n their own ways.

Cast
 Garry Marsh as  Timothy Bradbury 
 Eve Gray as Dolly Flint 
 Sebastian Shaw as John Goodman Johnson 
 Geraldine Fitzgerald as Jane Grey 
 Jack Melford as Bob Goodman 
 Patric Curwen as James Goodman 
 Henry Hallett as Mr. Buxton 
 Hal Walters as Sam Sloper

References

Bibliography
 Chibnall, Steve. Quota Quickies: The Birth of the British 'B' Film. British Film Institute, 2007.

External links

1935 films
1935 crime films
British crime films
1930s English-language films
Films directed by Leslie S. Hiscott
Films shot at Twickenham Film Studios
RKO Pictures films
Quota quickies
Films set in department stores
Films set in England
British black-and-white films
1930s British films